The 2011–12 Drake Bulldogs men's basketball team represented Drake University during the 2011–12 NCAA Division I men's basketball season. The team, which plays in the Missouri Valley Conference (MVC), was led by fourth-year head coach Mark Phelps and played their home games at the Knapp Center.

Preseason and exhibition
Ryan Wedel graduated, but returned as graduate assistant. The Bulldogs replaced two-thirds of their coaching staff. Frank Weisler left the team after suffering a career-ending pre-season injury. Brennen Newton is no longer with the team.

The Bulldogs were picked to finish 7th in the pre-season MVC poll.

Several players suffered pre-season injuries. Seth VanDeest will redshirt the season along with Reece Uhlenhopp who only played one minute against Indiana State. In addition, Rice & Alexander were suspended for the Bulldog's exhibition and first regular season games due to an off-the-court shoplifting incident. As a result of injuries and suspensions, the Bulldogs played their exhibition game versus Quincy with just five scholarship players.

Regular season
After easily defeating Upper Iowa, Drake’s first real test resulted in an impressive win against in-state rival Iowa State. The win significantly raised expectations for the Paradise Jam where the Bulldogs would play Ole Miss, Winthrop, & Virginia. The Bulldogs would lose 2 out those 3 games to finish 6th.

Upon returning to the Knapp Center over Thanksgiving Weekend, the Bulldogs resumed a streak that began at the end of 2010–11: Win at home, lose on the road. The Bulldogs 12-game home winning streak would be snapped on Jan. 7 against in-state rival Northern Iowa. Following the loss, the Bulldogs went on a 4-game winning streak, the longest in 3 seasons which included two road wins.

The week of Jan. 22-Jan. 28 featured what many called the most challenging week of the season. After getting destroyed at Northern Iowa, Drake would put up a nice effort against #15 Creighton but would ultimately fall. The biggest win of the season to date would come Jan. 28 where the Bulldogs won a triple-overtime thriller against Wichita State in a game that lasted over 3 hours. Drake would drop their next contest at Indiana State as a result of poor shooting.

On Feb. 2, team Captain Ben Simons was diagnosed with mononucleosis. With Simons out indefinitely, the Bulldogs would score the lowest points in a home game since 1949 in a 57–39 loss against Missouri State on Feb. 4. A loss at Illinois State would be the third consecutive loss for the Bulldogs. The Bulldogs would capture their largest win since Phelps took over as head coach (2008–09 season) at home against Evansville.

Drake would suffer only its second loss in the annual Bracketbuster contests with a loss against New Mexico State. After winning on senior night, the Bulldogs would fall at Wichita State to close regular season play.

Drake finished the regular season as part of a 5 way tie for third place in the conference. Unfortuantly Drake's two losses against Missouri State would force Drake into playing a Thursday night game to open the 2012 MVC Tournament.

Post-season
After easily defeating Bradley, Drake would face Creighton in the MVC Tournament Semi-Finals. Despite an early 12–3 lead, Creighton would lead at halftime and go on a 15–4 run in the second half. Although the Bulldogs would close the gap to 3 late in the game, Creighton had better free throw shooting at the end of the game to defeat Drake by 7.

Drake accepted a bid to play in the 2012 CollegeInsiders.com Post-Season Tournament. The Bulldogs defeated North Dakota in the first postseason game at the Knapp Center ever for their first non-MVC Tournament postseason win in 37 years. Drake would fall in the second round to Rice, ending their season.

Roster

Schedule

|-
!colspan=9| Exhibition

|-
!colspan=9| Regular season

|-
!colspan=9 | 2012 State Farm MVC Tournament

|-
!colspan=9| 2012 CIT

Games listed as MVC-TV broadcast on  Fox Sports Midwest, Fox Sports Indiana, Fox Sports Kansas City, Comcast Sportsnet Chicago, ESPN3, and AT&T U-Verse among other local providers.

References

Drake
Drake Bulldogs men's basketball seasons
Drake
Drake
Drake